The Monks of Thelema is a novel by Walter Besant and James Rice. It was published in 1878 by Chatto & Windus, London.
  
This novel includes descriptions of a sort of "church of Thelema", similar to the Abbey of Thélème, described in Rabelais's Gargantua. Aleister Crowley later founded a religion named Thelema.

References

1878 British novels
Chatto & Windus books
Adaptations of works by François Rabelais